Marie Naylor (1856 – 1940) was a British artist and militant suffragette .

Life
Naylor was born in London in 1856. She studied art and had a self portrait exhibited at the Royal Academy in 1890 which was commented on by the Illustrated London News. She studied in Paris and exhibited in various exhibitions and she had a one-woman exhibition at Galerie Dosbourg in 1898 before returning to the UK where she took an interest in women's suffrage.

In 1907 she joined the Women's Social and Political Union. In February 1908 she was one of several suffragette including Vera Wentworth and the Brackenbury sisters who were arrested for the Pantechnicon Raid. This WSPU stunt was to drop off a large group of women from a removal van (a pantechnicon) so that they could storm the House of Commons.

In 1909 and 1910 she stayed at Eagle House with Linley and Emily Blathwayt. On 9 April 1910 she was given the honour of planting a tree in "Annie's Arboretum".

Naylor died in Richmond in 1940 after an air raid.

References

1850 births
1940 deaths
19th-century English women artists
20th-century English women artists
Artists from London
British women's rights activists
English suffragists
Eagle House suffragettes
British civilians killed in World War II
Deaths by airstrike during World War II